Lilah Veronica Parsons (born 18 February 1988) is an English radio DJ, TV presenter, actress and former model, best known for being a presenter on MTV, co-presenting Capital Breakfast with Dave Berry and George Shelley and hosting a solo radio show on Heart.

Career
Parsons began modelling at the age of 20, working for brands such as Chanel, Vivienne Westwood and Swatch before getting a job at MTV and moving into presenting.

She is represented by 84World and by InterTalent as an actor.

Media
Parsons hosted several shows at MTV UK, such as MTV Essentials, MTV Asks and This Week’s MTV Top 20, as well as MTV's coverage of Snowbombing Festival in Austria in 2013 and 2014; some of these programmes also aired elsewhere on MTV Live HD. Parsons also hosted a weekly programme on Fridays and co-hosted Hoxton Fashion Show on Shoreditch web radio station Hoxton Radio in 2014 and 2015.

In February 2016, along with George Shelley, Parsons was confirmed as a new co-presenter of Capital Breakfast, joining Dave Berry and replacing Lisa Snowdon, who left the show at the end of 2015. In early 2016, she hosted the Brits Red Carpet live show alongside George Shelley. The duo also hosted the Brits Red Carpet in 2017, interviewing Ed Sheeran, Katy Perry, Little Mix, Dua Lipa and more.

In December 2017, Parsons began to cover radio shows on Heart FM, a sister network of Capital (both are owned and operated by Global). On 9 January 2018, it was announced that she would be hosting her own late show Friday to Sunday nights from 10pm, Heart's Feel Good Weekend. The first episode aired four days later.

Parsons left Heart in December 2021 and was replaced by Rezzy Ghadjar.

Parsons co-hosted the first season (2017–18) of PopBuzz Presents, a weekly entertainment show that is live-streamed on Twitter with guests such as Meghan Trainor, Craig David, Louis Tomlinson and P!nk.

On Channel 5's daily live morning phone-in debate programme The Wright Stuff and its 2018 replacement Jeremy Vine she is a frequent guest.

Personal life
Parsons is the daughter of Sir John Christopher Parsons and The Hon. Lady Parsons (formerly The Hon. Anne Constance Manningham-Buller). Her maternal grandfather was Reginald Manningham-Buller, 1st Viscount Dilhorne, and is the niece of Eliza Manningham-Buller. She attended Oundle School in Northamptonshire, and briefly studied French at the University of Exeter.

Parsons is an Ambassador for The Children's Air Ambulance charity, which serves as a flying intensive care unit for children across the UK.

References

External links
 Profile at 84 World
 @lilahparsons on Twitter
 @lilahparsons on Instagram

Living people
English female models
English radio presenters
English radio DJs
Capital (radio network)
1988 births
British women radio presenters